The most noticeable plan in South Korea’s smart grid project is the construction of a Smart Grid Testbed on Jeju Island. The South Korean government selected Jeju, in June 2009, as the Smart Grid Test-bed, and broke ground in August 2009. Testbed is the very proof of a Smart Grid, the basis for a low carbon, green growth strategy. Therefore, this project demonstrates Korea’s aspiration for green growth. Jeju Smart Grid Test-bed will become the world’s largest Smart Grid community that allows the testing of the most advanced Smart Grid technologies and R&D results, as well as the development of business models. This Test-bed
will also serve as the foundation for the commercialization and industrial export of Smart Grid technologies. It is expected to greatly contribute to strengthening Korea’s position as a leader in the global Smart Grid industry.This project is conducted with the participation of the Korean government, Korea Smart Grid Institute (KSGI), KEPCO, the Jeju Special Autonomous Province, companies joining the complex, Korea Smart Grid Association, research institutes, and academia. A total of 64.5 billion won will be injected between 2009 and 2013.

About 10 consortiums in five areas will participate in testing technologies and developing business models. The three strategic directions stated in the vision and goals of the Jeju Smart Grid Test-bed initiative clearly show the nature of a green-growth
strategy embedded in this project. From the national standpoint, this project aims to raise energy efficiency and implement green-energy infrastructure by building eco-friendly infrastructure that reduces CO2 emissions. From the industrial standpoint, this project seeks to secure a new growth engine that will drive Korea in the age of green growth. And from an individual standpoint, this project is headed for low carbon and green life by enhancing quality of
life through experiences of and participation in a low carbon, green life.

Test-bed background

The Korean government announced its CO2 reduction target for 2020. Among the three options it had considered, Seoul chose the most stringent goal of cutting greenhouse gas emissions by 4% from 2005 levels. The target represents a 30% reduction from the estimated level of 2020. This goal is deemed very challenging since Korean industry had doubled its greenhouse gas emissions between 1990 and 2005, the fastest growth in the OECD. Korea has voluntarily set its 2020 emission reduction target. With this pledge, Seoul seeks to be a model for other countries including China and India who are categorized as developing countries under the Kyoto Protocol; the two countries thus have no binding obligation but to announce its reduction target by 2030.

Korea is also pursuing sustainable development while dealing with climate change. At the same time, it is shifting toward a low-carbon economy and a society capable of recovering from climate change. As part of these efforts, Korea launched a Smart Grid national project to achieve green growth in a transparent, comprehensive, effective, and efficient way. This project envisions laying the foundation for a low carbon, green-growth economy by building a Smart Grid. Thus, it can serve as a yardstick to evaluate the future of Korea’s green-growth economy. In light of this, Korea came up with a proactive and ambitious plan to build a Smart Grid Test-bed on Jeju Island to prove its determination in the low carbon, green-growth strategy.

Progress of Jeju Test-bed

December 2004: Set out comprehensive measures for electric power IT
June 2009: Select Jeju as the Smart Grid Test-bed
August 2009: Break ground for the Jeju Smart Grid Test-bed project
November 2009: Select lead organizations for the Jeju Smart Grid Test-bed project
December 2009: Sign an agreement for the Smart Grid Test-bed and build the Test-bed

Jeju Test-bed Features

Close collaboration between public and private sectors
Verification of different power market models
Participants: KEPCO, telecommunications companies and home appliance manufacturers, such as LG, SKT, KT and Samsung
Open to foreign companies

See also
Smart grids in South Korea

References

External links
2010 World Smart Grid Forum
Jeju, test-bed for the world’s Smart Grid industry, The Jeju Weekly, February 5, 2011

Electric power in South Korea